The Earthbound Papas are a Japanese progressive rock/metal band performing songs and interpretations of music from video games, notably including the Final Fantasy series. Nobuo Uematsu, the acclaimed composer of music in the Final Fantasy series, formed the band after his previous band, The Black Mages, disbanded in 2010. In addition to new arrangements of some Final Fantasy tracks, they  have also arranged tracks from other projects that featured Uematsu as a composer and they have produced original compositions for the band's albums. 

In 2010, the Earthbound Papas were featured on the Distant Worlds II: More Music from Final Fantasy live orchestral release, in which they joined the orchestra for a performance of the song Dancing Mad from Final Fantasy VI.

The band have also worked on Hyperdimension Neptunia Victory and Megadimension Neptunia VII alongside internal Idea Factory composer Kenji Kaneko.

Discography
Albums
 Octave Theory - 2011

 Dancing Dad - 2013

External links 
  

2011 establishments in Japan
Final Fantasy music
Instrumental rock musical groups
Japanese instrumental musical groups
Japanese progressive metal musical groups
Japanese progressive rock groups
Japanese symphonic metal musical groups
Musical groups established in 2011
Musical quintets
Nintendocore musical groups
Symphonic rock groups
Video game music cover bands
Video game musicians